Nick Coster (born 24 September 1985) is a Dutch former professional footballer. He last played professionally as a left back for RKC Waalwijk in the Dutch Eerste Divisie, whom he had joined in 2014.

Club career
A hard-working leftsided defender or midfielder, he formerly played for ADO Den Haag, FC Dordrecht and FC Volendam. He was released by RKC in summer 2016 and joined amateurs DOVO.

In 2018, he left DOVO and retired from football.

References

External links
 Voetbal International profile 
 Profile - RKC

1985 births
Living people
Footballers from Alphen aan den Rijn
Association football fullbacks
Dutch footballers
ADO Den Haag players
FC Dordrecht players
FC Volendam players
RKC Waalwijk players
Eredivisie players
Eerste Divisie players